Abbas Kuh (also Romanized as ‘Abbās Kūh) is a village in Aliyan Rural District, Sardar-e Jangal District, Fuman County, Gilan Province, Iran. At the 2006 census, its population was 477, in 122 families.

References 

Populated places in Fuman County